Charles Wilkinson may refer to:

Charles Wilkinson (MP) (1725–1782), English Member of Parliament
Charles Edmund Wilkinson (1807–1870), acting Governor of British Ceylon
Charles Wilkinson (cricketer) (1813–1889), English cricketer and clergyman
Charles Wilkinson (priest) (1823–1910), Archdeacon of Totnes
Charles Smith Wilkinson (1843–1891), Australian geologist
Charles Wilkinson (New Zealand politician) (1868–1956), New Zealand politician
Charlie Wilkinson (footballer) (1907–1975), English footballer with Leeds United, Sheffield United and Southampton
Bud Wilkinson (Charles Burnham Wilkinson, 1916–1994), American football player and coach
Charles Wilkinson (director), Canadian film and television director